MTV Classic (formerly VH1 Smooth, VH1 Classic Rock, and VH1 Classic) is an American pay television network owned by Paramount Media Networks. It was originally launched in 1998 as VH1 Smooth, an adult contemporary and smooth jazz channel. It was relaunched as VH1 Classic Rock in 1999 (later renamed VH1 Classic until 2016), with an emphasis on classic rock. On August 1, 2016, in honor of MTV's 35th anniversary, the channel was rebranded as MTV Classic, and now exclusively shows music videos from all genres from the late 1970s to the mid 2010s.

History

1998–1999: VH1 Smooth 
VH1 Smooth launched on August 1, 1998 as a part of the "Suite" digital package, delaying the original launch date of July 31, 1998. The channel focused on smooth jazz, new age, and adult contemporary music. The first music video to play on the channel was a cover of "Makin' Whoopee" by Branford Marsalis.

1999–2016: VH1 Classic 

Relaunched on August 1, 1999 as VH1 Classic Rock, the channel primarily featured a mainstream rock/adult hits-formatted mix of music videos and concert footage from the 1960s to the 1980s, though it originally included a wider range of genres and time periods. The channel name was quickly changed to VH1 Classic in 2000.

The network played only music videos upon launch, but quickly expanded to a varied line-up of music-themed programs. This included themed music video compilation blocks (with categories such as Heavy Metal music, or popular music of the 1980s), full-length concerts, music documentaries such as the Classic Albums and Behind the Music series, music-oriented films (such as Purple Rain and The Blues Brothers), and an original talk show, That Metal Show. They also re-broadcast programs first shown on the main VH1 channel, including Pop-Up Video and I Love the '80s.

In January 28 until February 15, 2015, VH1 Classic aired a 24-hour, 19-day marathon of NBC's Saturday Night Live in celebration of the show's 40th anniversary. As a result, the network broke a previous record for the longest continuous marathon in television history set by FXX's twelve-day marathon of The Simpsons.

2016–present: MTV Classic 
In July 2016, Viacom announced that on August 1, the 35th anniversary of the original MTV's launch, the network would rebrand as MTV Classic. The channel's programming continues to focus on classic music videos and programming (including notable episodes of MTV Unplugged and Storytellers), but skews more towards from the late 1970s, 1980s, 1990s, 2000s to the mid 2010s. The rebranded network schedule also included reruns of past MTV original series such as the 2011 Beavis and Butt-head revival and Laguna Beach: The Real Orange County. The network's relaunch took place at 6:00 a.m. ET with a rebroadcast of MTV's first hour on the air, which was also simulcast on MTV and online via Facebook live streaming, branded as "MTV Hour One" (the channel, as VH1 Classic, had recently aired it to mark the network's 30th anniversary in 2011). Several VH1 Classic programs were retained in the existing schedule, albeit in late night hours.

Three days leading up to January 1, 2017, MTV Classic aired 24-hour block "Decade-a-thons" consisting of music videos from the 1980s leading up to the 2000s. Afterwards, MTV Classic unveiled a new automated all-music video schedule, with all of the older MTV and VH1 Classic series content removed. Since then, the only deviation from the automation has been "roadblock" simulcasts of the annual MTV Video Music Awards and MTV Movie & TV Awards to remove any competition from other Paramount networks, as well occasional marathons of older MTV shows to promote new series or season launches (as was done with The Hills to promote The Hills: New Beginnings).

As of the end of the year 2016, the channel was the least-watched English-language channel on all of U.S. subscription providers, averaging only 30–35,000 viewers on an average night in primetime (a decline of nearly a third from the already-low numbers VH1 Classic had netted in 2015), which was likely a factor in the network quickly abandoning their new format after five months. As of the end of May 2017, its numbers have slipped even further to an average of 14,000 viewers per night, only ahead of the moribund Esquire Network and beIN Sports, which at that time of the year is in its non-prime sports season. Even those low numbers were halved by the end of July 2017, as that month's ratings showed it averaging 7,000 viewers per night, ahead of only the beIN networks. If not for the addition of the seven Entertainment Studios Networks to Nielsen monitoring at the end of 2017, along with a decline in beIN Sports's ratings, it would have been the lowest rated English-language network in 2017 with a 14,000 viewer/night average. Since then, it has steadily remained the fourth-to-last ranked network, behind beIN Sports and ESN's Comedy.TV and its five-network cumulative "ESN Lifestyles" entry for the remainder of its networks.

Programming

References

External links 
 

MTV channels
Music video networks in the United States
English-language television stations in the United States
Television channels and stations established in 1998
Companies based in New York City
Classic television networks
Nostalgia television in the United States